Nguyễn Thu Thủy could refer to:

Nguyễn Thu Thủy (artist) (born 1971), Vietnamese artist
Nguyễn Thu Thủy (Miss Vietnam) (1976–2021), Vietnamese beauty pageant